Krzysztof Jan Gonciarz (born 19 June 1985) is an internet creator, filmmaker, and YouTuber, responsible of the channels Zapytaj Beczkę, Krzysztof Gonciarz, and TheUwagaPies on YouTube. He is the owner and creator of Japanese-based filmmaking company Tofu Media. He formerly worked as the journalist for Gry-Online.

History

Early life 
Krzysztof Gonciarz was born on 19 June 1985, in the city of Kraków, Poland. He graduated the Jan III Sobieski High School in Kraków, and later the Jagiellonian University at the cultural studies course of the Faculty of Philosofy.

Career 
From 2008 to 2012, he was a journalist for the Gry-Online internet website about the video games. In 2012, he voiced the character of Stuart Zurgo in the Polish-language dubbing of the video game Ratchet & Clank: Full Frontal Assault.

On 29 April 2011, Gonciarz had created his first channel on YouTube service, originally titled Wybuchające Beczki (translation from Polish: exploding barrels), and later renamed to Krzysztof Gonciarz. On 30 November 2011, he had created his second channel, originally titled TheBeeczka, where he begun exclusively posting comedy videos. His first channel became host to his other videos, which includes vlogs, reviews, travel videos, and sponsored projects. In 2016, TheBeeczka was renamed to Zapytaj Beczkę (translation from Polish: ask the barrel).

In 2014, he moved to Tokyo, Japan, to the district of Shibuya, where he established his film production company, Tofu Media. In 2018, the company had opened its branch in Poland.

In 2014, he had started his third YouTube channel, titled TheUwagaPies, on which, together with Katarzyna Męcińska, he begun posting English-language vlogs.

In 2016, in the partnership with semiconductor chip manufacturer Intel, he had created series of videos promoting the company's products. The series consisted of four videos filmed in different places across Asia. It included: More than one life filmed in Hong Kong, If You Were Born Japanese filmed in Tokyo, 48 hours in Seoul filmed in Seoul, South Korea, and Step One filmed in Taiwan.

In 2017, Krzysztof Gonciarz, had created a short film, titld The Breakup based on the Black Mirror television series, that was produced as part of the webseries Little Black Mirror. The series were produced for Netflix Polska by Jacek Ambrosiewicz, in collaboration with four Polish-language YouTube channels, which included Krzysztof Gonciarz, Emce (co-created by Huyen Pham and Marcin Nguyen), Grupa Filmowa Darwin (co-created by Jan Jurkowski and Marek Hucz), and Martin Stankiewicz. All four episodes were released on 19 January 2018, on the YouTube channel of their respective creators. The video produced by Gonciarz, featured him and Kasia Mecinski, and used realism and ordinary technology, such as a Panasonic Lumix DC-GH5 that emulates vlog aesthetics.

In February 2018, in the partnership with Eurosport television network, he had created the series of video showcasing the behind the scenes of the organization of the 2018 Winter Olympics in Pyeongchang County, South Korea. Following the success of the series, Eurosport had signed with him the contract, to make another series of videos during the 2020 Summer Olympics.

In 2019, the Manggha Museum of Japanese Art and Technology in Kraków, Poland hosted the art exhibition created by Gonciarz, titled Tokio 24. The exhibition included the 20-minute long video depicting the daily cycle of Tokyo, the room of "micro-delights", and the room of neon lights. It was available from 12 July 2019 to 29 September 2019. It became the most popular art exhibition hosted by the museum.

In 2021, Gonciarz again in the partnership with Eurosport, he had created the series of video showcasing the behind the scenes of the organization of the 2020 Summer Olympics in Tokyo, Japan.

Filmography

Acting 
 2018: Little Black Mirror as Krzysztof
 2020: Kuba Wojewódzki as himself

Polish dubbing 
 2012: Ratchet & Clank: Full Frontal Assault as Stuart Zurgo

Directing 
 2018: Little Black Mirror

Writing 
 2018: Little Black Mirror

Books 
 2011: Wybuchające Beczki – zrozumieć gry wideo
 2012: U Mad? The Internet's Guide to Idiots (published under pen name Christopher Gonciarz)
 2012: WebShows: Sekrety Wideo w Internecie
 2019: Rozum i Godność Człowieka (written together with Bartek Przybyszewski)
 2021: Róża, a co chcesz wiedzieć? Część druga (anthology by multiple authors)

References 

1985 births
Living people
20th-century Polish male actors
21st-century Polish male actors
20th-century Polish male writers
21st-century Polish male writers
20th-century Polish non-fiction writers
21st-century Polish non-fiction writers
Comedy YouTubers
Commentary YouTubers
YouTube filmmakers
YouTube vloggers
YouTube travel vloggers
Polish bloggers
Polish comedians
Polish critics
Polish filmmakers
Polish YouTubers
Polish opinion journalists
Polish expatriates in Japan
Polish male film actors
Polish male video game actors
Polish male voice actors
Polish male non-fiction writers
Polish male marathon runners
Polish writers in English
Artists from Kraków
Film people from Kraków
Journalists from Kraków
Male actors from Kraków
Writers from Kraków
People from Shibuya
Artists from Tokyo
Comedians from Tokyo
Male actors from Tokyo
Male voice actors from Tokyo
Writers from Tokyo
Video game critics
Jagiellonian University alumni